The 2010 World Wrestling Championships were held at the Olympic Stadium in Moscow, Russia. The event took place between September 6 to September 12, 2010.

Medal table

Team ranking

Medal summary

Men's freestyle

Men's Greco-Roman

Women's freestyle

Participating nations
629 competitors from 85 nations participated.

 (1)
 (2)
 (3)
 (14)
 (5)
 (4)
 (21)
 (21)
 (3)
 (16)
 (3)
 (14)
 (1)
 (1)
 (20)
 (2)
 (2)
 (5)
 (12)
 (2)
 (7)
 (3)
 (3)
 (8)
 (1)
 (5)
 (1)
 (8)
 (13)
 (14)
 (16)
 (3)
 (11)
 (2)
 (2)
 (11)
 (10)
 (14)
 (5)
 (8)
 (21)
 (2)
 (21)
 (13)
 (6)
 (6)
 (3)
 (2)
 (1)
 (1)
 (13)
 (1)
 (14)
 (1)
 (1)
 (4)
 (1)
 (4)
 (2)
 (1)
 (16)
 (1)
 (4)
 (14)
 (21)
 (1)
 (2)
 (4)
 (5)
 (2)
 (1)
 (5)
 (16)
 (13)
 (9)
 (6)
 (5)
 (3)
 (17)
 (6)
 (21)
 (21)
 (1)
 (16)
 (4)

References
Results

External links
Official website

 
FILA Wrestling World Championships
Wrestling World Championships
World Wrestling Championships
International wrestling competitions hosted by Russia